The Cotswold Motoring Museum is a museum in the Cotswolds village of Bourton-on-the-Water, Gloucestershire, England. It features motoring history of the 20th century.

Collection 
The museum's collection includes cars, motorcycles, bicycles, caravans, and motoring memorabilia of the 20th century.

The museum's toy collection includes pedal cars, bicycles, toy cars, buses, aeroplanes and other vehicles, model kits, meccano built into vehicles and structures, wooden and metal vehicles, and penny tin toys.

The collection also includes the children's television star Brum that is featured in the first two series and opening titles. The museum also features in the show's opening title sequence as Brum leaves the museum, where he is on display, and heads into the Big Town. It also features in the closing sequence as well, when Brum drives back into the museum.

History 

The museum was founded in 1978 by car collector Mike Cavanagh, who also features in Brum. In 1999 Cavanagh sold it to the Civil Service Motoring Association, a not-for-profit organisation, who continues to run it.

Awards  
In 2003 the Museum won the Heart of England Tourist Board's Visitor Attraction of the Year, and in 2004 they won the Museums and Heritage Award for their interpretation project "Big Ideas for Small Children".

References

Notes

External links 
 Official website

Automobile museums in England
Museums in Gloucestershire
Motorcycle museums in the United Kingdom
Driving in the United Kingdom
Toy museums in England
Museums established in 1978
1978 establishments in England